Qaralar (also, Karalar and Karaly) is a village and municipality in the Sabirabad Rayon of Azerbaijan.  It has a population of 776.

References 

Populated places in Sabirabad District